Niehaus is a German surname, meaning "new house" in a Low German dialect.

Geographical distribution
As of 2014, 47.3% of all known bearers of the surname Niehaus were residents of Germany (frequency 1:12,215), 35.4% of the United States (1:73,560), 13.8% of South Africa (1:28,200) and 1.4% of Canada (1:187,745).

In Germany, the frequency of the surname was higher than national average (1:12,215) in the following states:
 1. Lower Saxony (1:2,934)
 2. North Rhine-Westphalia (1:5,749)
 3. Bremen (1:7,573)

In South Africa, the frequency of the surname was higher than national average (1:28,200) in the following provinces:
 1. Western Cape (1:10,395)
 2. Mpumalanga (1:14,656)
 3. Free State (1:16,818)
 4. North West (1:18,761)

In the United States, the frequency of the surname was higher than national average (1:73,560) in the following states:
 1. Iowa (1:12,670)
 2. Ohio (1:14,770)
 3. Indiana (1:15,492)
 4. Missouri (1:21,073)
 5. Kentucky (1:22,121)
 6. Minnesota (1:37,498)
 7. South Dakota (1:39,864)
 8. Illinois (1:40,797)
 9. Nebraska (1:41,580)
 10. Wisconsin (1:66,496)
 11. West Virginia (1:72,193)

People
Bernd H. Niehaus Quesada (born 1941), Costa Rican lawyer and diplomat
Carl Niehaus (born 1959), South African politician and diplomat
Charles Henry Niehaus (1855–1935), American sculptor
Dave Niehaus (1935–2010), American sportscaster
Dick Niehaus (1892–1957), American baseball player
Ed Niehaus,  American businessman and publicist
Frank Niehaus (1902–1985), American football player (American football)
Joseph T. Niehaus, Sr. (1906-1989), American farmer, businessman, beekeeper, and politician
Jutta Niehaus (born 1964), German racing cyclist
Lennie Niehaus (born 1929), American saxophonist, arranger, and composer
Rena Niehaus (born 1954), German actress
Ruth Niehaus (1925–1994), German actress
Steve Niehaus (born 1954), American football player (American football)
Tom Niehaus (born 1957), American politician
Valerie Niehaus (born 1974), German actress

See also

 Neuhaus, High German variant of the name
 Niehues, Westphalian variant of the name

References

German-language surnames
Surnames of German origin
Low German surnames